Edie Adams (born Edith Elizabeth Enke; April 16, 1927 – October 15, 2008) was an American comedian, actress, singer and businesswoman. She earned the Tony Award and was nominated for an Emmy Award.

Adams was well known for her impersonations of sexy stars on stage and television, especially Marilyn Monroe. She was the frequent television partner of Ernie Kovacs, her husband. Adams founded two beauty businesses: Edie Adams Cosmetics and Edie Adams Cut 'n' Curl.

Early life
Adams was born in Kingston, Pennsylvania, the only daughter of Sheldon Alonzo Enke and his wife, Ada Dorothy (née Adams). She had an elder brother, Sheldon Adams Enke. The family moved to nearby areas such as Shavertown and Trucksville and spent a year in New York City before settling in Tenafly, New Jersey, where she attended Tenafly High School. Ada Enke taught her daughter singing and piano; mother and daughter were members of the Grove City Presbyterian church choir. Adams's grandmother, a seamstress, taught her how to sew. She made her own clothing beginning in the sixth grade and Adams would later have her own designer line of clothing, called Bonham, Inc.

She earned a vocal degree from Juilliard and then graduated from Columbia School of Drama. She studied at the Actors Studio in New York and at the Traphagen School of Fashion. Initially, Adams could not decide whether to pursue a career in fashion design or music, so she tossed a coin, and music won.

In 1949–50, she appeared in the early live television show Bonnie Maid's Versatile Varieties as one of the original "Bonnie Maids" doing live commercials for the sponsor.

In 1950, she won the "Miss U.S. Television" beauty contest, which led to an appearance with Milton Berle on his television show. Her earliest television work billed her as Edith Adams. One of her early appearances was on Arthur Godfrey's Talent Scouts. She was seen by the producer of the Ernie Kovacs show Three to Get Ready (in Philadelphia), who invited her to audition. Adams had very little experience with popular music and could perform only three songs. She later stated: "I sang them all during the audition, and if they had asked to hear another, I never would have made it." She became part of the show in July 1951. Adams had never seen the program she was hired for. When he saw his daughter on the show, Adams's father was upset to find her role involved trying to avoid pies in the face. In one of his last interviews, Kovacs looked back on the early days, saying, "I wish I could say I was the big shot that hired her, but it was my show in name only—the producer had all the say. Later on I did have something to say and I said it, 'Let's get married.'"

Career

Adams began working regularly on television with Kovacs and talk show pioneer Jack Paar. After a courtship that included mariachi bands and an unexpected diamond engagement ring, Adams and Kovacs eloped; they were married on September 12, 1954, in Mexico City. Adams was initially uncertain about marrying Kovacs. She went on a six-week European cruise, hoping to come to a decision. After three days away and many long-distance phone calls, Adams returned home with an answer: yes. It was Kovacs's second marriage and lasted until his death in a car accident on January 13, 1962.

Adams and Kovacs received Emmy nominations for best performances in a comedy series in 1957. In 1960, she and Kovacs played themselves in The Lucy–Desi Comedy Hour final television special on CBS, during which she performed the send-off song "That's All". Adams made four appearances on What's My Line? (once as "Edith Adams (Mrs. Ernie Kovacs)" while her husband was on the panel; once together with Kovacs; twice alone as Edie Adams).

Adams starred on Broadway in Wonderful Town (1953) opposite Rosalind Russell (winning the Theatre World Award), and as Daisy Mae in Li'l Abner (1956), winning the Tony Award for Best Featured Actress in a Musical. She played the Fairy Godmother in Rodgers and Hammerstein's original Cinderella broadcast in 1957. Adams was to play Daisy Mae in the film version of Li'l Abner but was unable due to the late arrival of her daughter, Mia Susan Kovacs.

After Kovacs's death, his network, ABC, gave Adams a chance with her own show, Here's Edie, which received five Emmy nominations but lasted one season, in 1963. Kovacs was a noted cigar smoker, and Adams did a long-running series of TV commercials for Muriel Cigars. She remained the pitch-lady for Muriel well after Kovacs's death, intoning in a Mae West style and sexy outfit, "Why don't you pick one up and smoke it sometime?" Another commercial for Muriel Cigars, which cost 10 cents, showed Adams singing, "Hey, big spender, spend a little dime with me" (based on the song "Big Spender" from the musical Sweet Charity). Adams's cigar commercials made her one of the top three most-recognizable television celebrities. In subsequent years, Adams made sporadic television appearances, including on Fantasy Island, The Love Boat, McMillan & Wife, Murder, She Wrote and Designing Women.

Adams played supporting roles in several films in the 1960s, including the embittered secretary of two-timing Fred MacMurray in the Oscar-winning film The Apartment (1960). She was the wife of a presidential candidate (played by Cliff Robertson) in The Best Man (1964) and was reunited with Robertson for the comedy The Honey Pot (1967). In 2003, as one of the surviving headliners from the all-star comedy It's a Mad, Mad, Mad, Mad World (1963), she joined actors Marvin Kaplan and Sid Caesar at a 40th anniversary celebration of the film. She was also a successful nightclub headliner.

Shortly after her husband's death, Adams won a "nasty custody battle" with Kovacs's ex-wife over Edie's stepdaughters. His ex-wife had previously kidnapped the girls during a visit years before; because Kovacs was their legal guardian, he and Edie had worked tirelessly to locate his daughters and bring them home.

Another court battle began for Adams in the same year, this time with her mother-in-law, who refused to believe there were more debts than assets in her son's estate. Mary Kovacs accused her daughter-in-law of mismanaging the estate and petitioned for custody of her granddaughters. The dispute lasted for years, with Adams remaining the administrator of her husband's estate and guardian of the three girls. She worked for years to pay her late husband's tax debt to the IRS. The couple's celebrity friends planned a TV special benefit for Edie and her family, but she declined, saying, "I can take care of my own children." She spent the next year working practically non-stop.

Starting over

Adams started her own businesses, Edie Adams Cosmetics, which sold door-to-door, and Edie Adams Cut 'n' Curl beauty salons, which she began in 1967. She once owned a 160-acre (65 ha) California almond farm and was the spokeswoman for Sun Giant nuts. Because of her 20 years of commercials for Muriel Cigars (retiring in 1976) and her successful business ventures, Adams went from being mired in debt after Kovacs's fatal accident in 1962 to being a millionaire in 1989.

Personal life
After Kovacs's death, Adams was married two more times. In 1964, she married photographer Martin Mills. In 1972, she married trumpeter Pete Candoli, with whom she appeared in a touring production of the Cole Porter musical Anything Goes. In addition to raising stepdaughters Bette and Kippie from her marriage to Kovacs, Adams gave birth to daughter Mia Susan Kovacs (killed in an automobile accident in 1982) and son Joshua Mills.

Adams was a Republican and campaigned for Dwight Eisenhower's re-election during the 1956 presidential election.

Adams was an early advocate of civil rights, frequently lending her support to the movement at celebrity events  and on her own television show during the early sixties. She insisted that her duet with Sammy Davis Jr. on her variety show Here's Edie be staged so that they were seated next to each other – as equals. Prior to that, entertainers of different races and sexes were unable to perform next to one another, so that one had to be in front of or behind the other.

Death

Adams died in Los Angeles, California, on October 15, 2008, at age 81, from cancer and pneumonia. She was interred in Forest Lawn Memorial Park, Hollywood Hills, alongside her first husband Ernie and between her daughter, Mia, and her stepdaughter, Kippie. After her death an article in The New York Times said that her work "both embodied and winked at the stereotypes of fetching chanteuse and sexpot blonde".

Kovacs' legacy
Adams archived her husband's television work, which she described during a 1999 videotaped interview with the Archive of American Television. She later testified on the status of the archive of the short-lived DuMont Television Network, where both she and husband Kovacs worked during the early 1950s. Adams said that so little value was given to the film archive that the entire collection was loaded into three trucks and dumped into Upper New York Bay.

Upon discovering that her husband's work was disappearing through being discarded and re-use of the tapes, Adams initially used the proceeds of his insurance policy and her own earnings to purchase the rights to as much footage as possible.

Filmography

Television

References

External links

 The official Edie Adams website
 
 

1927 births
2008 deaths
20th-century American actresses
Actresses from Pennsylvania
Actresses from New Jersey
American cosmetics businesspeople
American musical theatre actresses
American Presbyterians
American television actresses
American women comedians
Burials at Forest Lawn Memorial Park (Hollywood Hills)
Businesspeople from Pennsylvania
Deaths from cancer in California
Columbia University School of the Arts alumni
Deaths from pneumonia in California
Donaldson Award winners
Juilliard School alumni
People from Kingston, Pennsylvania
People from Grove City, Pennsylvania
People from Tenafly, New Jersey
Tenafly High School alumni
Theatre World Award winners
Tony Award winners
Traphagen School of Fashion alumni
Pennsylvania Republicans
New Jersey Republicans
California Republicans
20th-century American comedians
20th-century American singers
20th-century American women singers
20th-century American businesspeople
20th-century American businesswomen
American film actresses
21st-century American actresses